Lerum is a Norwegian surname. Notable people with the surname include:

Arnie Lerum (1879–1911), American football player and coach
Bjarne Lerum (1941–2010), Norwegian businessperson and politician
Kåre Lerum (born 1939), Norwegian businessperson and politician
May Grethe Lerum (born 1965), Norwegian novelist